Kasun Eljabal  is a Syrian village located in Hama Nahiyah in Hama District, Hama.  According to the Syria Central Bureau of Statistics (CBS), Kasun Eljabal had a population of 586 in the 2004 census.

References 

Populated places in Salamiyah District